Amphicallia kostlani is a moth of the  subfamily Arctiinae. It is found in Ethiopia.

References

Endemic fauna of Ethiopia
Moths described in 1911
Arctiini
Insects of Ethiopia
Moths of Africa